Ours is a Lausanne Métro station on M2 line. It was opened on 27 October 2008 as part of the inaugural section of the line, from Croisettes to Ouchy–Olympique. The station is located between CHUV and Bessières.

References

Lausanne Metro stations
Railway stations in Switzerland opened in 2008